1973 is the second full-length studio album by Seirom, released on November 9, 2012 by Aurora Borealis.

Track listing

Personnel
Adapted from the 1973 liner notes.
 Maurice de Jong (as Mories) – instruments, effects, recording, cover art
 Aaron Martin – cello

Release history

References

External links 
 
 1973 at Bandcamp

2012 albums
Seirom albums